Pan Yunhe (born November 4, 1946) is a Chinese specialist in artificial intelligence and geographic information systems. He served as President of Zhejiang University and Vice President of the Chinese Academy of Engineering.

Early life 
Pan, a native of Zhejiang Province, graduated from Tongji University, and received a master's degree from Zhejiang University. He is a professor of computer science at Zhejiang University, and he took the office of the president there in 1995. He became a member of the Chinese Academy of Engineering in 1997.

Pan did his undergraduate study at Tongji University in Shanghai, and his postgraduate study at Zhejiang University in Hangzhou. From 1995 to 2006, he was the president of Zhejiang University. He was appointed vice-president of the Chinese Academy of Engineering on June 7, 2006.

References

1946 births
Living people
Engineers from Zhejiang
Tongji University alumni
Zhejiang University alumni
Presidents of Zhejiang University
Members of the Chinese Academy of Engineering
Educators from Hangzhou
Artificial intelligence researchers